United Nations Security Council Resolution 250, adopted unanimously on April 27, 1968, warned Israel against holding an Independence Day Parade in Jerusalem, Israel's proclaimed capital. Israel ignored the resolution. In response, the Council passed UNSC resolution 251 condemning Israel's actions.

See also
Arab–Israeli conflict
List of United Nations Security Council Resolutions 201 to 300 (1965–1971)

References
Text of the Resolution at UN.org

External links
 

 0250
 0250
Israeli–Palestinian conflict and the United Nations
April 1968 events